Jasper is a city in and the county seat of Walker County, Alabama, United States. Its population was 14,352 as of the 2010 census. Named in honor of Sergeant William Jasper, an American Revolutionary War hero, Jasper was settled around 1815 and incorporated on August 18, 1886.

The first significant growth of the area was in 1886, when the Kansas City, Memphis and Birmingham Railroad and the Sheffield & Birmingham Railroads were completed through Jasper. The population grew from 200 people in 1886 to more than 3,000 in 1890. In a special edition in 1891, the Mountain Eagle stated there were six coal mines, two sandstone quarries, 400 coke ovens, one foundry and machine shop, two saw mills, one brick works, four hotels, and two banks.

Historic sites 
Jasper has several sites listed on the National Register of Historic Places. These include the John Hollis Bankhead House, First United Methodist Church, Jasper Downtown Historic District, and Walker County Hospital.

Geography
Jasper is located at  (33.842347, -87.277174).

Climate

Demographics

2000 census
At the 2000 census, there were 14,052 people, 5,728 households, and 3,809 families living in the city. The racial makeup of the city was 84.15% White, 13.98% Black or African American, 0.21% Native American, 0.53% Asian, 0.02% Pacific Islander, 2.7% some other race, and 1.4% two or more races. 4.4% of the population was Hispanic.

Of the 5,728 households 26.1% had children under the age of 18 living with them, 47.4% were married couples living together, 14.4% had a female householder with no husband present, and 33.5% were non-families. 29.7% of households were one person and 13.2% were one person aged 65 or older. The average household size was 2.38, and the average family size was 2.93.

The age distribution was 21.5% under the age of 18, 8.1% from 18 to 24, 24.4% from 25 to 44, 27.7% from 45 to 64, and 18.3% 65 or older. The median age was 41.5 years. For every 100 females, there were 90.3 males. For every 100 females age 18 and over, there were 95.3 males.

The median household income was $41,586 and the median family income was $54,059. Males had a median income of $51,548	versus $35,248 for females. The per capita income for the city was $27,927. About 14.8% of families and 16.7% of the population were below the poverty line, including 29.5% of those under age 18 and 11.1% of those age 65 or over.

2010 census
At the 2010 census, there were 14,352 people, 5,760 households, and 3,831 families living in the city. There were 6,478 housing units at an average density of 241 per square mile (93/km). The racial makeup of the city was 81.3% White, 13.4% Black or African American, 0.3% Native American, 0.7% Asian, 0.2% Pacific Islander, 0.l.

Of the 5,760 households 27.3% had children under the age of 18 living with them, 49.2% were married couples living together, 13.9% had a female householder with no husband present, and 33.5% were non-families. 31.1% of households were one person and 14.6% were one person aged 65 or older. The average household size was 2.33, and the average family size was 2.91.

The age distribution was 21.9% under the age of 18, 8.6% from 18 to 24, 25.8% from 25 to 44, 24.0% from 45 to 64, and 19.7% 65 or older. The median age was 41 years. For every 100 females, there were 86.6 males. For every 100 females age 18 and over, there were 82.5 males.

The median household income was $33,044 and the median family income was $43,674. Males had a median income of $35,182 versus $22,868 for females. The per capita income for the city was $19,491. About 10.2% of families and 13.8% of the population were below the poverty line, including 18.3% of those under age 18 and 13.2% of those age 65 or over.

2020 census

As of the 2020 United States census, there were 14,572 people, 5,269 households, and 3,176 families residing in the city.

Arts and culture 
Jasper is the location of the SyFy Channel's documentary show "Town of the Living Dead". The city is also home to the annual "Foothills Festival" that happens every year in "Historic Downtown Jasper Square." They hold live music and food vendors all around the Famous Downtown Jasper Square. In 2017 the dates for the "Foothills Festival" have been announced for September 15 and September 16. In the TV series Lost, Jasper is the hometown of James "Sawyer" Ford.

The 2020 documentary film Jasper Mall centers around the economically distressed Jasper Mall.

Schools
Elementary
T.R. Simmons Elementary School (PreK-1), Memorial Park Elementary School (2-3)

Intermediate
Maddox Intermediate School (4-6)

Junior High
Jasper Junior High (7-8)

High School
Jasper High School (9-12)
(formerly Walker High School) (Originally Walker County High School, WCHS)

North Highlands School
School for students with disabilities of all grades

Former Schools
West Jasper Elementary School (Closed 2017)

Media

Newspaper
The Daily Mountain Eagle (daily)

Radio
WJLX/1240 kHz (Oldies)
WIXI/1360 kHz (Spanish)
WQJJ-LP/101.9 MHz (Adult Contemporary/Oldies)
W268BM/101.5 MHz: rebroadcasts WJLX.

Television
 W25FC-D/25

Notable people

 Jason Aaron, comic writer
 John H. Bankhead II, United States Senator
 Tallulah Bankhead, actress
 Walter W. Bankhead, member of the 77th United States Congress
 William Brockman Bankhead, Speaker of the United States House of Representatives
 Tom Bevill, member, United States Congress
 Ronnie Coleman, NFL player
 Eric Dover, musician 
 Violet Edwards, member of the Madison County Commission, representing the 6th District 
 Eric Esch, professional boxer, MMA fighter and kick boxer
 Raymond D. Fowler, psychologist and Professor Emeritus at the University of Alabama
 James Shepherd Freeman, admiral, United States Navy
 James Stanley Freeman, businessman
 Polly Holliday, actress
 Steven Jack Land, renewal theologian within the Pentecostal movement 
 George Lindsey, actor
 Carter Manasco, U.S. Representative from Alabama
 Terry Owens, NFL player 
 Sandy Posey, singer
 Jim Pyburn,  professional baseball player
 Greg Reed, member of the Alabama Senate, representing the 5th District 
 Michael Rooker, actor
 Leigh Sherer, Miss Alabama 1995

References

External links

City of Jasper
 Institute of Southern Jewish Life, History of Jasper
http://www.encyclopediaofalabama.org/article/h-2536

Cities in Alabama
Cities in Walker County, Alabama
County seats in Alabama
Birmingham metropolitan area, Alabama